Drew McCreadie, born 1967, is a Vancouver, British Columbia-based actor, playwright and improvisor. He was the winner of Best Male Improvisor in Canada at the 2007 Canadian Comedy Awards. His play The Cat Who Ate Her Husband was first performed in Vancouver by Ruby Slipper Theatre Company, and won five Jessie Richardson Theatre Awards including for best new script and best play. Ruby Slippers Theatre Company also produced his Christmas farce The Hotel Bethlehem in December 2011, 2012 & 2013.

He has also directed and appeared in several films and television programs. McCreadie wrote and directed a short film The Valet, that won him The Most Promising Director of a Canadian Short Film at the Vancouver International Film Festival. He co-wrote an episode of Casper Scare School (credited as Andrew McCreadie) with co-writer Ian Boothby.

He is a member of Urban Improv improvisation troupe and Canadian Content sketch troupe, whose members have/do include The Simpsons comic book writer Ian Boothby, Comedy Inc. star Roman Danylo and Air Farce actress Penelope Corrin. McCreadie is an alumnus of The Vancouver Theatresports League. He has performed with improv and sketch comedy company The Second City onboard NCL Cruiseline cruise-ships. As a member of the sketch group "Canadian Content", McCreadie can be heard on the group's three albums "Official Bootleg", "Sorry" and "Canuxploitation".

He is the author of several books including an instructional book titled "You Will Never Be Funny: An Introduction to Improvised Comedy", a satirical self-help book "GO GET HELP!", and a comedic novel "A Test Case of Life".

McCreadie also plays electric guitar, and has performed as a studio musician on hiphop artist UNDA's album "Tomorrow Never Comes", and on The Sailing Conductor's Album AAA (Thousand Miles Away). He is one half of the 'wank jazz' duo Knoodle (with John Murphy) who have released an album, the digital download of which is $7,000 (although all tracks are free individually). He has also released several albums of original music including "What You Get", "Living Like a Hobo, But With Money", and "The Out Zone".

In 2011 he moved to Thailand, and started a Bangkok-based improv comedy company Bangkok Improv In September 2014 he opened Bangkok Thailand's only English language comedy venue, The Comedy Club Bangkok  with actor Chris Wegoda, as Creative Co-Directors.

Before moving to Vancouver, McCreadie ran for provincial government in Ontario in the 1987 general election as the Progressive Conservative candidate in the electoral district of Downsview. He also ran a controversial campaign to head the student union in his second year of studies at Toronto's York University and won a term as President of the York Student Federation (YSF) in 1987-88. McCreadie served as President of his highschool, Cawthra Park Secondary School, in 1985-86.

References 

Canadian male comedians
21st-century Canadian dramatists and playwrights
Writers from Vancouver
Comedians from Vancouver
York University alumni
University of Western Ontario alumni
Living people
Progressive Conservative Party of Ontario candidates in Ontario provincial elections
Canadian male dramatists and playwrights
21st-century Canadian male writers
Year of birth missing (living people)
21st-century Canadian comedians
Canadian Comedy Award winners